Pasquale Pistorio (born 6 January 1936, in Agira) is an Italian company director, ex president of STMicroelectronics and board member of Confindustria. From 17 April 2007 until 3 December 2007 he was president of Telecom Italia. He graduated in Electrical Engineering, his early career was at Motorola where he became the European marketing director in 1967. From here his responsibility increased to Director of WorldWide Marketing, Vice President of Motorola Corporation and Director General of the International Semiconductor Division, responsible for planning, production and marketing worldwide excluding the USA.

In 1980 he returned to Italy to lead the SGS group, a microelectronics company that then went on to merge with the semiconductor arm of Thompson, a French electronics company, becoming SGS-Thomson Microelectronics (now known as STMicroelectronics), a company, which under his leadership, grew to become one of the leading worldwide manufacturers of semiconductors. In 2005 Pistorio stepped down as CEO and was named honorary president. Two years later he was nominated President of Telecom Italia.

Pistorio served as vice-president of Confindustria for innovation and research from 2005 to 2008. He sits as an independent consultant on the board of Fiat, and also of Chartered Semiconductor. He is also involved with:
Conseil Stratégique pour l'attractivité du pays auprès du Premier Ministre français
Internal Advisory Council Singapore Government
International Business Council of the World Economic Forum
World Business Council for sustainable development
 Conseil Stratégique des Technologies de l'Information francese
'European Round Table of Industrialists (ERT).

He has received many honors among which include Honorary degrees from University of Genova, Malta, Pavia, Catania, Palermo and Sannio.

In April 2005 he founded the Pistorio Foundation. The Foundation is a not-for-profit organization based in Geneva, Switzerland, whose scope is to supply aid in the fields of health, nutrition and education, whether through direct aid, donations or  financial or humanitarian support for charities helping children, in the most deprived areas of the world, suffering from war, natural disasters, and other calamities.

Awards and recognition
He was awarded "il Premio Euno", by the Kiwanis Club of Enna, on its 14th anniversary in 1999. In 2011 he was awarded the IEEE Robert N. Noyce Medal.
Honorary degree, University of Pavia, 1998

References

External links
Pistorio Foundation
Chartered Semiconductor Manufacturing
Upstream Ventures
ST Foundation

Living people
Italian chief executives
Italian engineers
1936 births
Honorary Citizens of Singapore